Amarissa Kiara Tóth (born 10 February 2003) is a Hungarian tennis player. Her mother is of Thai descent.

Tóth has a career-high WTA rankings of 547 in singles, attained on 21 November 2022, and 264 in doubles, achieved on 3 October 2022.

She made her WTA Tour main-draw debut at the 2021 Budapest Grand Prix, where she received a wildcard into the doubles tournament.

ITF Circuit finals

Singles: 3 (1 title, 2 runner-ups)

Doubles: 17 (10 titles, 7 runner-ups)

Junior Grand Slam finals

Doubles: 1 (runner-up)

References

External links
 
 

2003 births
Living people
Hungarian female tennis players
Hungarian people of Thai descent
21st-century Hungarian women